Diane Clare (born Diane Dirsztay; 8 July 1938 – 21 June 2013) was an English film and television actress.

Career
Clare started acting at a very young age playing uncredited baby parts in films such as The Ghosts of Berkeley Square and The Silver Fleet, and for a time was one of the most highly paid babies in British films.

At the age of three, Clare was too old to continue playing babies so her career came to a standstill. "I'd been longing to play in pictures from the time I was dropped all those years ago because I'd become too old to play baby parts", she told an interviewer in the late 1950s, after her comeback with roles in The Reluctant Debutante and Ice Cold in Alex. She received excellent reviews from playing in the latter film, and one journalist wrote: "I forecast that Miss Diane Clare is going to be one of the big names among actresses in the future."

She appeared in many horror films during the 1960s such as Hammer Horror's Plague of the Zombies during her career. In 1965 she had a small part as Julie (the girl at the food counter) in the "Death at Bargain Prices" episode of The Avengers.  In 1967, she was screentested for the role of Tara King in The Avengers, but she did not get the part.

Personal life
Diane Dirsztay was born on 8 July 1938 in Wandsworth, London. She lied about her age so she could study at R.A.D.A. After her film comeback in 1958, Clare attributed it to a 'lucky' black beret which she always wore to auditions. "It brings me luck," she told one journalist after appearing in Ice Cold in Alex, "I wore it when I went to the audition for Anna Massey's part [in The Reluctant Debutante], and again when I went to Elstree Studios for my film test." Clare retired from acting when she married the novelist and playwright Barry England (born 1932 – died 2009) in 1967; the couple had two children, Kate (born 1969) and Christopher (born 1971). Her hobbies included dancing, riding, swimming and going to the cinema.

Death
Diane Clare died on 21 June 2013, aged 74, from undisclosed causes.

Filmography

References

External links

1938 births
2013 deaths
20th-century English actresses
Actresses from London
English film actresses
English television actresses
Place of death missing
Alumni of RADA